Hiroichi Sakai (Sakai Hiroichi; 21 March 1929 – 22 November 2021) was a Japanese politician. A member of the Komeito party, he served in the House of Representatives from 1969 to 1993.

References

1929 births
2021 deaths
Japanese politicians
Members of the House of Representatives (Japan)
Komeito politicians
People from Wakayama Prefecture